TV Slon Extra is a Bosnian local commercial television channel based in Tuzla.
The program is broadcast every day from 16 to 23 hours via cable networks and it is mainly produced in Bosnian language.

References

External links 
 Official website

Mass media in Tuzla
Television stations in Bosnia and Herzegovina
Television channels in North Macedonia
Television channels and stations established in 2005